Sin Filtro may refer to:
 No Filter (film) a 2016 Chilean film
 A song on Golden (Romeo Santos album)